Elachista aphyodes is a moth of the family Elachistidae. It is found in Utah, United States.

The length of the forewings is 5.9 mm. The forewings are relatively broad. The basal quarter of the costa is gray. The wing is otherwise white. The hindwings are gray and the underside of the wings is also gray.

Etymology
The species name is derived from Greek aphyodes (meaning whitish).

References

Moths described in 1997
aphyodes
Moths of North America